Chris Goggans (also known as Erik Bloodaxe in honor of the Viking king Eric I of Norway), is an American hacker, founding member of the Legion of Doom group, and a former editor of Phrack magazine. He is known as an expert in security, as well as for his statements on hacker ethic and responsibility.

Career history
Around 1990-1991 Goggans and other Legion members set up a computer security firm, Comsec, which went out of business by 1992. He later became a senior network security engineer for WheelGroup, a network security group.

In closing remarks at a 1995 conference, Goggans remarked that the global hacker community was disorganized and uncoordinated, suggesting that they should focus an attack on some foreign country, such as France.

, Goggans is a recognized expert on information security. He has performed network security assessments for some of the world's largest corporations, including all facets of critical infrastructure, with work spanning 22 countries across four continents. Groggans has worked with US Federal law-enforcement agencies on notorious computer crime cases. His work has been referenced in publications such as Time, Newsweek, and Computerworld, and on networks such as CNN and CNBC.

Groggans has been asked to present at major conferences such as COMDEX, CSI, ISACA, and the Black Hat Briefings, as well as having also co-authored numerous books including Implementing Internet Security, Internet Security Professional Reference, Windows NT Security, and The Complete Internet Business Toolkit.

During the summer of 2003, Goggans was invited to become an associate professor at the University of Tokyo's Center for Collaborative Research.. In the winter of 2008, Chris Goggans was in India for the ClubHack hacker convention. 

Currently, Goggans is president of SDI, Inc., a Virginia-based corporation providing information security consulting.

Issues with law enforcement
Goggans was raided by the US Secret Service on March 1, 1990, but was not charged.

In a 1994 interview, he claimed he had never engaged in malicious hacking, explaining:

"Malicious hacking pretty much stands against everything that I adhere to. You always hear people talking about this so-called hacker ethic and I really do believe that. I would never wipe anything out. I would never take a system down and delete anything off of a system. Any time I was ever in a system, I'd look around the system, I'd see how the system was architectured, see how the directory structures differed from different types of other operating systems, make notes about this command being similar to that command on a different type of system, so it made it easier for me to learn that operating system"

"Sure, I was in The Legion of Doom. I have been in everybody's system. But I have never been arrested. I have never broken anything, I have never done anything really, really, criminally bad.”

However, in a phone call intercepted by the Australian Federal Police as part of an investigation into Australian hacker Phoenix (Nahshon Even-Chaim) Goggans was heard planning a raid in which the pair would steal source code and developmental software from Execucom, a Texas-based software and technology company headquartered in Austin, and sell it to the company's rivals.

In the call, recorded on February 22, 1990, and later presented in the County Court of Victoria as evidence against Even-Chaim, Goggans and Even-Chaim canvassed how much money they could make from such a venture and how they would split fees from Execucom's competitors. During the call Goggans provided Even-Chaim with a number of dial-up access numbers to Execucom's computers, commenting: "There are serious things I want to do at that place", and "There’s stuff that needs to happen to Execucom".  While there is no evidence that Goggans and Even-Chaim acted on this discussion, Goggans' statement of his intentions calls into question the nobility of his hacking ethics.

References

External links
Interview with Erik Bloodaxe
BLOODAXE COMES OUT SWINGING - Phrack editor Chris Goggans on Masters Of Deception Retrieved from the Archive on 2006-11-21
Gang War In Cyperspace

Legion of Doom (hacker group)
Living people
1970 births